The Premio Dormello is a Group 2 flat horse race in Italy open to two-year-old thoroughbred fillies. It is run at Milan over a distance of 1,600 metres (about 1 mile), and it is scheduled to take place each year in October.

The event is named after Dormello, the stud farm of Federico Tesio. It was given Group 2 status in 1975 and relegated to Group 3 level in 1988 before reclaiming its Group 2 status in 2019.

Records
Leading jockey since 1986 (3 wins):
 Mirco Demuro – Sonda (1999), Adamantina (2010), Bugie d'Amore (2011)

Leading trainer since 1986 (6 wins):
 John Dunlop – Three Tails (1986), Miss Secreto (1988, dead-heat), Brockette (1990), Scarlet Plume (1995), Barafamy (1998), Manbala (2005)

Winners since 1989

 The 2008 running was cancelled because of a strike.
 The 2021 races took place at Capannelle.

Earlier winners
 1973: Tivola
 1974: Sinthesis
 1975: Ancholia
 1976: Roman Blue
 1977: Miss Carina
 1978: Mesange Bleue
 1979: Cos Display
 1980: Val d'Erica

 1981: Ilenia
 1982: Stemegna
 1983: Sly Moon
 1984: Miss Gris
 1985: Ivor's Image
 1986: Three Tails
 1987: Dyreen
 1988: Marina Duff / Miss Secreto *

* The 1988 race was a dead-heat and has joint winners.

See also
 List of Italian flat horse races

References
 Racing Post:
 galopp-sieger.de – Premio Dormello.
 horseracingintfed.com – International Federation of Horseracing Authorities – Premio Dormello (2016).
 pedigreequery.com – Premio Dormello – Milano San Siro.

Flat horse races for two-year-old fillies
Horse races in Italy
Sport in Milan